Joel Thomas Wanasek is an American record producer and owner of JTW Recording in Milwaukee, Wisconsin. Wanasek started recording in 2002, initially as a self-taught producer, but by January 2006, he was able to quit his job and professionally dedicate to his recording business.

He has worked with bands such as Blessthefall, Machine Head, Attila, Miss May I and Monuments, amongst others.

Career and education 

Joel Wanasek started playing violin at the age of 10, and guitar at the age of 12. He was inspired to practice by Randy Rhoads, forming a band called Crystal Reign which lasted for a number of years. He earned a Bachelor of Business Administration at the University of Wisconsin-Whitewater

He created the now defunct instructional guitar web site InsaneGuitar.com, before forming his band Dark Shift in 2000, where he played lead guitar. They signed to AJA Records, but disbanded before releasing an album. Joel worked on Dark Shift's debut album "The Assault" which was released in June 2003. The band would then open up for Gigantour in Milwaukee, which featured Megadeth, Dream Theater, Symphony X, among others.

In his producing career, he has worked with labels such as Fueled by Ramen, Virgin Music, Century Media Records, No Sleep Records, Fearless Records, Nuclear Blast Records, among others. In 2016, the song "Is There Anybody Out There?" by Machine Head chartted at #36 on Billboard's Hot Mainstream Rock, which he co-produced. In 2018, Wanasek mixed and mastered Miyavi's "Samurai Sessions Vol.2", with the opening song, "Dancing With My Fingers", topping the iTunes Japanese charts.

He uses Steinberg Cubase as his digital audio workstation.

Entrepreneurship

Unstoppable Recording Machine 
URM Academy is an online audio school created by Wanasek, Joey Sturgis and Eyal Levi, which describes itself as "the world's best online music school for rock & metal producers". Through its program Nail The Mix, the platform offers monthly mixing sessions with professionally-recorded songs and livestream commentary from the producer who originally mixed them. The program has featured bands such as Lamb of God, Asking Alexandria, The Devil Wears Prada, Chelsea Grin, Born of Osiris, A Day to Remember, Opeth, Neck Deep, Papa Roach, Meshuggah, Periphery, Gojira, etc. and producers such as Andrew Wade, Tue Madsen, Devin Townsend, Logan Mader, Jens Bogren, Kane Churko, Machine, among others. Nail the Mix won two "2 Commas Club Awards" from ClickFunnels for "entrepreneurs who have used ClickFunnels to grow their business to the 7-figure mark".
The platform also offers a podcast, Q&As, lessons ("Fast Track") and, as part of its Enhanced subscription, "Mix Rescue", where students submit their own mixes to be critiqued and cleaned-up during a live broadcast.

Drumforge 
Drumforge is a music software company founded by Joel Wanasek, Joey Sturgis and Joe Wohlitz that provides drum sample libraries and audio plug-ins.
The company has released libraries by Taylor Larson, Luke Holland, Daniel Bergstrand, Matt Greiner and others.

Riffhard 

Riffhard is an online guitar school created by Monuments guitarist John Browne, in partnership with URM Academy, and co-owned by Eyal Levi and Joel Wanasek, mainly dedicated to rhythm guitar.

Other projects 

Wanasek has also developed plug-ins in collaboration with Joey Sturgis Tones (JST), namely "Bus Glue Joel Wanasek", a series of bus compressors.

He has also participated in the Joey Sturgis Forums Podcast, along with Sturgis and Levi, which was said to "cover a range of music industry topics such as marketing, touring, mixing and producing"

Production discography

Studio albums

2010s

2000s

Works
 "The Ultimate Guide to Becoming a Guitar Virtuoso" - 2005

References

Notes

External links
 
 Allmusic — Production Credits

1981 births
Living people
Record producers from Wisconsin
People from Milwaukee